Trisil is a trade name for a thyristor surge protection device, an electronic component designed to protect electronic circuits against overvoltage.  Unlike a transient voltage suppression diodes, such as Transil, a Trisil acts as a crowbar device, switching ON when the voltage on it exceeds its breakover voltage.

Overview 
A Trisil is bidirectional, behaving the same way in both directions. It is principally a voltage-controlled triac without gate.  The behavior of a Trisil is similar to a SIDAC, but unlike SIDAC, Trisil devices are commonly used to protect circuits from overvoltage. They act faster and can handle more current.  In 1982, the only manufacturer was Thomson SA; a successor company, ST Microelectronics continues to make the devices.

This type of crowbar protector is widely used for protecting telecom equipment from lightning-induced transients and induced currents from power lines.  Other manufacturers of this type of device include Bourns (TISP) and Littelfuse (SIDACtor).  Rather than using the natural breakdown voltage of the device, an extra region is fabricated within the device to form a Zener diode.  This allows a much tighter control of the breakdown voltage.

It is also possible to make gated versions of this type of protector.  In this case, the gate is connected to the telecom circuit power supply (via a diode or transistor) so that the device will crowbar if the transient exceeds the power supply voltage.  The main advantage of this configuration is that the protection voltage tracks the power supply, thus eliminating the problem of selecting a particular breakdown voltage for the protection circuit.

See also 
 Transil
 Zener diode

References

External links 
 Overvoltage protection
 Trisil/Transil Comparison, ST Application Note (PDF)

Solid state switches
Voltage stability